Roland Schmitt (5 June 1912 – 20 December 1954) was a French football midfielder.

References

1912 births
1954 deaths
French footballers
Racing Club de France Football players
FC Sète 34 players
Toulouse FC players
Association football midfielders
France international footballers